The Gloucestershire County Women's Football League is a women's association football competition run by the Gloucestershire County Football Association. It consists of three divisions and sits at level 7 of the women's football pyramid in England.

Teams

The teams competing in the league for the 2020–21 season are:

Former champions

Cup competitions 
Teams participating in the Women's County League compete in the Gordon Perrett Memorial Cup, a competition named after a founder member of the league. The winners of the competition are as follows:

References

7
Football in Bristol
Football in Gloucestershire